Vanessa Sauzede (born 22 August 1982) is a French rhythmic gymnast. She represented France at the Olympic Games in 2000.

Career 
In 2000 Sauzede was selected as a member of the French group to compete at the Olympic Games held in Sydney, Australia. They scored 37.900 points in the qualifying round with teammates Anna-Sofie Doyen, Anne-Laure Klein, Anna-Sophie Lavoine, Laetitia Mancieri and Magalie Poisson and finished in ninth place not managing to reach the final.

References

External links

1982 births
Living people
French rhythmic gymnasts
Olympic gymnasts of France
Gymnasts at the 2000 Summer Olympics